The men's foil was a competition in fencing at the 2004 Summer Olympics in Athens. A total of 36 men from 20 nations competed in this event. Nations had been limited to three fencers each since 1928.  Competition took place in the Fencing Hall at the Helliniko Olympic Complex on August 16. The event was won by Brice Guyart of France, the nation's ninth victory in the men's foil (surpassing Italy for most all-time). Italy took the other two medals, with Salvatore Sanzo earning silver and Andrea Cassarà winning the bronze medal match.

Background

This was the 24th appearance of the event, which has been held at every Summer Olympics except 1908 (when there was a foil display only rather than a medal event). Two of the eight quarterfinalists from 2000 returned: silver medalist Ralf Bißdorf of Germany and fifth-place finisher Salvatore Sanzo of Italy. Sanzo had won the 2001 world championship, and his teammate Simone Vanni the 2002 title. The reigning (2003) world champion was Peter Joppich of Germany.

For the second consecutive Games, no nations made their debut in the men's foil. France and the United States each made their 22nd appearance, tied for most of any nation; France had missed only the 1904 (with fencers not traveling to St. Louis) and the 1912 (boycotted due to a dispute over rules) foil competitions, while the United States had missed the inaugural 1896 competition and boycotted the 1980 Games altogether.

Competition format

The 1996 tournament had vastly simplified the competition format into a single-elimination bracket, with a bronze medal match. The 2004 tournament continued to use that format. Bouts were to 15 touches. Standard foil rules regarding target area, striking, and priority were used.

Schedule

All times are Greece Standard Time (UTC+2)

Results

Preliminary round

As there were more than 32 entrants in this event, four first round matches were held to reduce the field to 32 fencers.

Main tournament bracket

The remaining field of 32 fencers competed in a single-elimination tournament to determine the medal winners.  Semifinal losers proceeded to a bronze medal match.

Final classification

References

Yahoo! Sports Athens 2004 Summer Olympics Fencing Results

Men's foil
Men's events at the 2004 Summer Olympics